Mohammad Khamis Saleh (born 11 March 1976) is a retired Emirati footballer. He played for Dubai's Al-Nasr sport club and Emirati internationals.

References

External links

1976 births
Living people
2007 AFC Asian Cup players
Place of birth missing (living people)
Al-Nasr SC (Dubai) players
Emirati footballers
United Arab Emirates international footballers
category; power pusher
[[Category:leg can not move at all